Scott Gump (born December 17, 1965) is a former American professional golfer. 

Gump was born in Merritt Island, Florida. He has had three Nationwide Tour victories and has finished runner-up three times in PGA Tour tournaments, including The Players Championship in 1999.

Professional wins (3)

Nationwide Tour wins (3)

Nationwide Tour playoff record (0–1)

Results in major championships

CUT = missed the half-way cut
"T" indicates a tie for a place

Results in The Players Championship

CUT = missed the halfway cut
"T" indicates a tie for a place

See also
1990 PGA Tour Qualifying School graduates
1994 Nike Tour graduates

References

External links

American male golfers
Miami Hurricanes men's golfers
PGA Tour golfers
Korn Ferry Tour graduates
Golfers from Florida
People from Merritt Island, Florida
1965 births
Living people